Rhythm 93.7 FM Lagos is an English speaking commercial radio station located in Victoria Island, Lagos after it was moved from its base in Lekki, Lagos. The station broadcasts an urban contemporary radio format, playing a variety of music genres including R&B, hip hop, with a blend of culture and style. It is owned and operated by Silverbird Communications under the Silverbird Group and is one of the most popular private radio stations in Nigeria.

Line Up

Awards
Nigerian Dotcom Awards 2014 - Best Internet Radio Station

See also

List of radio stations in Lagos

References

External links

Radio stations established in 1997
Radio stations in Lagos
Privately held companies of Nigeria
Companies based in Lagos
Urban contemporary radio stations
Silverbird Communications radio stations